The Oxford Shakespeare is the range of editions of William Shakespeare's works produced by Oxford University Press. The Oxford Shakespeare is produced under the general editorship of Stanley Wells and Gary Taylor.

Precursor 
Oxford University Press first published a complete works of Shakespeare in 1891. Entitled The Complete Works, it was a single-volume modern-spelling edition edited by William James Craig. This 1891 text is not directly related to the series known as the Oxford Shakespeare today, which is freshly re-edited.

The Complete Works
The Oxford Shakespeare includes a Complete Works edited by John Jowett, William Montgomery, Gary Taylor and Stanley Wells, appeared in 1986. It includes all of Shakespeare's plays and poems, as well as a biographical introduction. Each work is given a single-page introduction. There are no explanatory notes, but there is a glossary at the back of the book. Two related books accompany the main volume: William Shakespeare: A Textual Companion provides comprehensive data on editorial choices for scholars of the plays, and William Shakespeare: An Old-Spelling Edition presents the plays in their original spelling.

The Oxford Complete Works differs from other Shakespeare editions in attempting to present the text as it was first performed, rather than as it was first printed. This resulted in many controversial choices: for example, presenting Hamlet with several famous speeches relegated to appendices on the grounds that Shakespeare added them after the original performances; presenting two separate texts of King Lear due to the drastic differences between the two extant texts; and changing the name of Falstaff in Henry IV Part One to "Oldcastle" due to historical evidence that this name was used in the first performances even though it never survived to print. 

The Oxford Complete Works was the first to emphasize Shakespeare's collaborative work, describing Macbeth, Measure for Measure and Timon of Athens as either collaborations with or revisions by Thomas Middleton; Pericles as a collaboration with George Wilkins; Henry VI Part One as a collaboration with several unknown other dramatists; and Henry VIII and The Two Noble Kinsmen as collaborations with John Fletcher. It also broke with tradition in presenting Shakespeare's works in chronological order, rather than dividing them by genre.

In 2005, a second edition of the Complete Works was produced. It adds a full text of Sir Thomas More (edited by John Jowett), which may contain passages by Shakespeare, and Edward III (edited by William Montgomery), another play believed to be partly by Shakespeare. 

Somewhat controversially, the 2016 edition credits Christopher Marlowe as an equal co-author of Shakespeare for the three Henry VI plays, though some scholars doubt any actual collaboration.

The first two editions of the Norton Shakespeare, published by W.W. Norton, were largely based on the Oxford text, but departed from some of its decisions.

Individual plays

The term "Oxford Shakespeare" also refers to Oxford University Press's editions of individual Shakespeare plays and poems. These individual editions follow the same principles as the Complete Works, but their editors are permitted to reject choices made for the Complete Works if they feel strongly; for example, David Bevington's edition of Henry IV Part One uses "Falstaff" not "Oldcastle". The hardback editions feature distinctive purple dustjackets, while the paperbacks follow the design of the Oxford World's Classics editions of classic literature.

The editions were published as follows:
 Henry V (1982), ed. Gary Taylor
 The Taming of The Shrew (1982), ed. H. J. Oliver
 Troilus and Cressida (1982), ed. Kenneth Muir
 Titus Andronicus (1984), ed. Eugene M. Waith
 Julius Caesar (1984), ed. Arthur Humphreys
 Hamlet (1987), G. R. Hibbard
 Henry IV, Part 1 (1987), ed. David Bevington
 The Tempest (1987), ed. Stephen Orgel
 The Two Noble Kinsmen (1989), ed. Eugene M. Waith
 King John (1989), ed. A. R. Braunmuller
 Love’s Labour’s Lost (1990), ed. G.,R. Hibbard
 Macbeth (1990), ed. Nicholas Brooke
 The Merry Wives of Windsor (1990), ed. T. W. Craik
 Measure for Measure (1991), ed. N. W. Bawcutt
 All's Well That Ends Well (1993), ed. Susan Snyder
 As You Like It (1993), ed. Alan Brissenden
 Much Ado About Nothing (1993), ed. Sheldon P. Zitner
 The Merchant of Venice (1993), ed. Jay L. Halio
 Antony and Cleopatra (1994), ed. Michael Neill
 Coriolanus (1994), ed. R. B. Parker
 Twelfth Night (1994), eds. Roger Warren & Stanley Wells
 A Midsummer Night’s Dream (1995), ed. Peter Holland
 The Winter’s Tale (1996), ed. Stephen Orgel
 Henry IV, Part 2 (1998), ed. René Weis
 Cymbeline (1998), ed. Roger Warren
 King Henry VIII, or All is True (1999), ed. Jay L. Halio
 Romeo and Juliet (2000), ed. Jill L. Levenson
 The History of King Lear (2000), ed. Stanley Wells
 Richard III (2000), ed. John Jowett
 Henry VI, Part 3 (2001), ed. Randall Martin
 The Complete Sonnets and Poems (2002), ed. Colin Burrow
 Henry VI, Part 2 (2002), ed. Roger Warren
 The Comedy of Errors (2002), ed. Charles Whitworth
 Henry VI, Part 1 (2003), ed. Michael Taylor
 Pericles (2004), ed. Roger Warren
 Timon of Athens (2004), ed. John Jowett
 Othello (2006), ed. Michael Neill
 The Two Gentlemen of Verona (2008), ed. Roger Warren
 Richard II (2011), eds. Anthony B. Dawson & Paul Yachnin

With the publication of Richard II in August 2011, the canonical plays are complete, the only two plays remaining from the one-volume edition being Edward III and Sir Thomas More.

See also
 The Cambridge Shakespeare

References

External links
The Complete Works, 1st edition, at Bartleby.com.
The Complete Works, 2nd edition, at Oxford University Press.

Shakespearean scholarship
Oxford University Press books
1891 books
1986 books